Liv Mildrid Gjernes (born 2 June 1954 in Lunde, in Telemark, Norway) is a Norwegian artist and has given name to the contemporary style of decoration, sculpture, and furniture design known as Gjernes style. She lives and has her atelier in Eidsfoss, in Vestfold in Norway. She studied in Bergen high-school of art and design and at the Institute for Furniture and Room.
 

Apart from being chosen for vast number of sculptural decoration assignments for private and public institutions, she was commissioned by the Norwegian government to produce its wedding gift to Princess Märtha Louise and Ari Behn on 24 May 2002. The gift consisted of two cupboards specially designed for the wedding-couple with the title "Ikons for the Hearts". In each cupboard there were seven exclusive pieces of handicraft from different regions of Norway, produced by other outstanding Norwegian artists.

References 
"Ikons for the Hearts"   presentation by the Norwegian government

External links 
The artists Norwegian homepage

1954 births
Living people
People from Nome, Norway
Norwegian artists